Broken Hill Airport  is an airport located  southeast of Broken Hill, New South Wales, Australia.

The airport currently is used as a base of operations for the Royal Flying Doctor Service of Australia South-Eastern section thus making it a very important hub for this service.

It is also used extensively by the mining industry.

Airlines and destinations

Statistics
Broken Hill Airport was ranked 51st in Australia for the number of revenue passengers served in financial year 2009–2010.

See also
 List of the busiest airports in Australia
List of airports in New South Wales

References

Airports in New South Wales
Buildings and structures in Broken Hill, New South Wales
Transport in Broken Hill, New South Wales